= Marjorie Cook Education Center =

School in California

Coordinates: 32°46′5″N 117°8′27″W

Marjorie Cook Education Center is a school based in San Diego, California. It is affiliated with the Institute for Effective Education.

== Programs ==
- Elementary Program
- Adolescent Program
- Community Living Program
- Young Person's Annex
